The Made In New York Jazz Competition and Festival is a brand that started as a local festival in New York City and tristate area. In 2013 the brand introduced the first, online-based, global jazz competition, followed by the annual, International Jazz Gala at the Tribeca Performing Arts Center, Made In New York Jazz Festival in Montenegro and multiple independent shows mostly held in the US. The Brand debuted in 2010 and was founded by jazz aficionado, and music producer, Michael Brovkine.
Associated hashtags #madeinnyjazz #madeinnyjazzgala #madeinnyjazzmne

History 
The idea of organizing a global, online jazz competition was the brainchild of a musician and producer, Michael Brovkine. The concept was born in 2010, with the growing popularity of the internet, but it took another three years and the use of social media for the first competition to come to fruition.

In January 2013, The Made in New York Jazz Competition website launched, and by August 2013, the Competition had more than 250 registered artists and musicians representing 35 countries, and over 12,000 registered website users.

In May 2014, the first online-based, year-round jazz competition made its Gala Concert debut at the Tribeca Performing Arts Center, in New York City. Although the contest headquarters is located in New York, the contest itself occurs online. One of the unique aspects of the competition is that entries are accepted year-round, and winners are determined by the accumulation of votes received from online voters, committee members, and competition judges.

The Grand Prize for winning the contest includes $3,000 plus 10% of registration fees, round-trip ticket to the International Jazz Gala in New York as a performer (courtesy of Kawai Musical Instruments), various prizes from competition and gala sponsors, the opportunity to perform on stage with jazz legends, network with industry notables, and the chance to gain global exposure.

The competition gained popularity quickly, gaining over 30,000 registered jazz musicians and fans representing 50 countries around the globe.

In May 2016, Made In New York Jazz Competition launched the brand in Europe, in collaboration with Montenegrin publishing house, Rabbit Records and main partner, Capital Plaza, with an inauguration festival in Montenegro.

Leadership and Board of Members 
 Michael Brovkine: Founder & CEO
 Yaacov Mayman: Artist Director
 Alexandra Djordjevic: Managing Director
 Vladimir Maraš: Affiliate Director, Montenegro
 Pablo Elorza: Affiliate Director, Argentina
 Mario Biondi: Honored International Artistic Advisor (2016-2017)

Supporters, partners, and sponsors 
 French Embassy in the United States
 German Mission in the United States
 Balassi Institute
 Consulate of Montenegro in the United States
 Onassis Cultural Center
 Bodossaki Foundation
 Kawai Musical Instruments
 Alex Soldier
 Andy Filimon Photography
 Mario Biondi
 Cantamessa
 Gismart
 Synthogy
 Impression Cymbals
 Intellectsoft
 Capital Plaza
 Renault
 Hipotekarna Banka
 Telenor
 Adriatic Properties
 CdM Media
 Montenegro Ministry of Culture
 Hotel Ziya
 Yamaha/Eurounit
 Hard Rock Café
 Ethno Jazz Club Sejdefa
 US Embassy in Montenegro
 Porto Montenegro

Performers and gala hosts

First Annual Jazz Gala 2014 (New York) 
 Lenny White, Multi-Grammy Award Winner 
 Randy Brecker, Multi-Grammy Award Winner 
 Anita Vitale, Competition winner 
 Evgeny Lebedev, Second Place winner 
 Vladimir Maras
 Migayel Voskanyan and Friends
 Ricardo Baldaci
 Pablo Elorza
 Nick Vintskevich

Jazz Gala 2015 (New York) 
  Randy Brecker, Multi-Grammy Award Winner
 Bobby Sanabria, Grammy Award nominee 
 Alex Blake
 Yaacov Mayman
 Eden Rabin International Project, Competition winner 
 Jan Prax Quartet
 Polly Gibbons
 Uraz Kivaner
 Thana Alexa
 Sinan Alimanović

Jazz Gala 2016 (New York) 
 Rufus Reid
 Philip Harper
 Tommy Campbell
 Bobby Sanabria, Grammy Award nominee 
 George V. Johnson Jr.
 Federico Malaman
 Yaacov Mayman
 Giulia Malaspina
 Karim Maurice
 The Next Step Quintet
 Diogo Monzo
 João Barradas, Competition winner

Made In New York Jazz Festival 2016 (Montenegro) 

 Randy Brecker, Multi-Grammy Award Winner
 Bobby Sanabria, Grammy Award Nominee
 Edsel Gomez, Grammy Award Nominee
 Yaacov Mayman
 Anita Vitale
 George V. Johnson Jr.
 Essiet Essiet
 Vladimir Maras
 Nick and Leonid Vintskevich
 Ljuba Paunic
 Sule Jovovic
 Perunicic Miladin
 Ivan Aleksijevic

Jazz Gala 2017 (New York) 

 Lenny White
 John Benitez
 Roberto Quintero
 Yaacov Mayman 
 Juan Ibarra
 Antonino Restuccia
 Santiago Beis
 Barbie Camion
 Esra Kayıkçı
 Pamai Chirdkiatisak
 Victoria Petrovskaya
 Alexis Baro
 Vaja Mania
 Papuna Sharikadze
 Jorge Luis Pacheco

Made In New York Jazz Festival 2017 (Montenegro) 

 Mike Stern
 Alex Blake 
 Wayne Escoffery
 Yaacov Mayman
 Jerome Jennings
 Sharon Clark
 Sule Jovovic
 Aleksandar Grujic
 Vasil Hadzimanov
 Rick Swann
 João Barradas

5th Anniversary Jazz Gala 2018 (New York) 
 John Patitucci
 Randy Brecker
 Francisco Mela
 Yaacov Mayman
 Vladimir Maras
 Lauren Sevian
 Alexa Tarantino
 JD Warren & The Rudiment
 Jesús Javier Molina Acosta
 Michal Martyniuk
 Michael Moody

Made In New York Jazz Festival 2018 (Montenegro) 

 Dave Weckl
 Richie Goods
 Raymond Angry
 Yaacov Mayman
 Igmar Thomas
 Caloé
 Jorge Luis Pacheco
 Brianna Thomas
 Ivan Aleksijevic
 Sule Jovovic
 Max Kochetov 
 Ivan Ilic

6th Annual Jazz Gala 2019 (New York) 
 Al Foster
 John Lee
 Bobby Sanabria
 Yaacov Mayman
 Anthony Wonsey
 Alex Norris 
 Alexey Alexandrov
 Pureum Jin
 David Marino 
 Shuo-Kuan Shiao
 Nuci Nebieridze
 Alex's Sipiagin NYU Jazz Ensemble

Made In New York Jazz Festival 2019 (Montenegro) 
 Lenny White
 Bill Evans (saxophonist)
 Ameen Saleem
 Charenee Wade 
 Polly Gibbons
 Hermin Deurloo
 Pippo Corvino
 Sule Jovovic   
 Yaacov Mayman
 Vladimir Maras 
 Axel Tosca
 Vasil Hadzimanov
 Vladimir Krnetic

5th Anniversary Made In New York Jazz Festival 2020 (Montenegro) 

 Tommy Campbell
 Calvin Jones
 Marianne Solivan
 Yaacov Mayman
 Stafford Hunter
 Matija Dedic
 Sara Jovovic
 Rastko Obradovic
 Sule Jovovic
 Filip Bulatovich

6th Anniversary Made In New York Jazz Festival 2022 (Montenegro) 

 Stanley Jordan
 Lezlie Harrison
 John Lee
 Vincent Ector
 Cyrus Chestnut 
 Yaacov Mayman
 Freddie Hendrix
 Pedja Milutinovic
 Sule Jovovic
 Enes Tahirović

7th Anniversary Made In New York Jazz Festival 2022 (Montenegro) 
10 Days fest.
 Camille Thurman
 Allan Harris
 Benny Benack III
 Russell Hall 
 Jesús Molina
 Yaacov Mayman
 Darrell Green
 Ben Kraef
 Filip Bulatovic
 Shule Jovovic
 John Lee
 Freddie Hendrix
 Cyrus Chestnut 
 Lezlie Harrison
 Stanley Jordan
 Vince Ector

Categories 
 Solo Instrumental
 Solo Vocal
 Small Band
 Composer
 Arrangement

Grand Prize Winners

2014 
Anita Vitale from Italy

2015 
Eden Rabin International Project with artists from Israel, Germany, United States, and Chile

2016 
João Barradas from Portugal

2017 
European Jazz Trumpet France

2017 
LSAT Duo Lauren Sevian & Alexa Tarantino United States

2018 
Alexey Alexandrov United States

Judges

2014 
 Randy Brecker, 18 times nominated 6 time Grammy Award winner trumpet player
 Joe Lovano, Grammy Award winner 
 Lenny White, 3 times Grammy Award Winner jazz fusion drummer

2015 
 Randy Brecker 18 times nominated 6 time Grammy Award winner trumpet player r 
 Joe Lovano Grammy Award winner
 Lenny White 3 times Grammy Award Winner jazz fusion drummer

2016 
 Randy Brecker 18 times nominated 6 time Grammy Award winner trumpet player 
 Mike Stern, six-time Grammy Award nominee, jazz guitarist
 Lenny White 3 times Grammy Award Winner jazz fusion drummer

2017 
 Randy Brecker 18 times nominated 6 time Grammy Award winner trumpet player 
 Mike Stern, six-time Grammy Award nominee, jazz guitarist
 Lenny White 3 times Grammy Award Winner jazz fusion drummer

2018 

Randy Brecker 18 times nominated 6 time Grammy Award winner trumpet player 
Mike Stern, six-time Grammy Award nominee, jazz guitarist
Lenny White  3 times Grammy Award Winner jazz fusion drummer

References

External links 
 http://madeinnyjazz.com/ Official website
 http://facebook.com/madeinnyjazz
 https://twitter.com/madeinnyjazz
 http://instagram.com/madeinnyjazz

Music competitions in the United States
Jazz festivals in New York City